Closure is a term used in the wine industry to refer to a stopper, the object used to seal a bottle and avoid harmful contact between the wine and oxygen. 

They include:
 Traditional natural cork closures ('corks');
 alternative wine closures, such as screw caps, synthetic closures, glass closures.
 Historical applications no longer in use, such as wooden stoppers with cloth or wax

The choice of closure depends on issues such as the risk of cork taint, oxygen permeability and desired life of the wine. Another factor is consumer reaction, with the wine-buying public in Australia and New Zealand positive to alternative closures, while opinion is divided among consumers of the United States. In Europe, perceptions that associate screw caps with low-quality wine may be declining.

Synthetic wine bottle closures may allow for a controlled oxygen transfer rate.

Some natural cork closures may be "easy open, easy recork", removing the need for a corkscrew.

See also 
 Alternative wine closure
 Aging of wine

References

External links 
The Oeneo Closures Debate 2006 with Peter Ferriera, John Forrest, Peter Godden, Terry Lee and Jamie Goode

Wine packaging and storage